The Ambassador Extraordinary and Plenipotentiary of the Russian Federation to the United Arab Emirates is the official representative of the President and the Government of the Russian Federation to the President and the Government of the United Arab Emirates.

The ambassador and his staff work at large in the Embassy of Russia in Abu Dhabi. There is a Consulate General in Dubai, and a trade mission in the country.

The post of Russian Ambassador to the United Arab Emirates is currently held by Timur Zabirov, incumbent since 30 August 2021.

History of diplomatic relations

Diplomatic relations between the Soviet Union and the United Arab Emirates were first established in December 1971. However embassies were not established, nor ambassadors accredited, until 1986.  was the first ambassador, assigned to the post on 24 September 1986, and serving until 11 September 1990.  His successor, Konstantin Kharchev, was the sitting ambassador during the dissolution of the Soviet Union in 1991, and continued as representative of the Russian Federation until 15 August 1992.

List of representatives (1986 – present)

Representatives of the Soviet Union to the United Arab Emirates (1986 – 1991)

Representatives of the Russian Federation to the United Arab Emirates (1991 – present)

References

External links

 
United Arab Emirates
Russia